Doris Lake Aerodrome (formerly ) was a privately owned ice runway located on Doris Lake, Nunavut, Canada. The aerodrome, which was open from January to April, serviced the related explorations for the gold deposits that were found in the Hope Bay greenstone belt.

References

Airports in the Arctic
Defunct airports in Nunavut